Azari may refer to:
Āzari, anything related to Iranian Azerbaijan
 Azerbaijani people
 A person from the Iranian Azarbaijan 
 Old Azeri language, a now extinct Iranian language previously spoken in the Republic of Azerbaijan and Iranian Azerbaijan
 Azerbaijani language, a Turkic language
Āzari, a Persian surname meaning related to Āzar (fire in Persian)
 Azari Tusi
Azari Rural District, an administrative subdivision of North Khorasan Province, Iran
 the ancient name of the Catalan village of Vilassar de Dalt

See also
 Azeri (disambiguation)

Language and nationality disambiguation pages